Eckman Bluff  is an angular bluff, mostly ice covered but with a steep southeast rock face, rising to about  in the southern part of the Jones Bluffs, Bear Peninsula, on the Walgreen Coast of Marie Byrd Land. 

It was mapped by the United States Geological Survey from surveys and from U.S. Navy aerial photographs taken 1966. It was named by the Advisory Committee on Antarctic Names after Commander James F. Eckman, Engineer Officer on the USCGC Burton Island, 1970–71; (Executive Officer, 1975–76); Ship Operations Officer on the staff of the Commander, Naval Support Force, Antarctica, 1977–78 and 1978–79.

References 

Cliffs of Marie Byrd Land